Certification on demand refers to a process where digital certificates are issued for an electronic signature creation device that has already been sent out and is in the hands of the customer.

Sources
 

Identity management